Neil McNeill (born 27 February 1932) is a former  Australian rules footballer who played with South Melbourne in the Victorian Football League (VFL).

See also
 Australian football at the 1956 Summer Olympics

Notes

External links 

Living people
1932 births
Australian rules footballers from Victoria (Australia)
Sydney Swans players